The closing ceremony of the 2015 Pan American Games took place on Sunday July 26, 2015, beginning at 8:00 p.m. EDT at the Rogers Centre (Pan Am Dome) in Toronto, Ontario, Canada. The closing ceremony was produced and directed jointly by three companies B5C Productions, BaAM Productions and FiveCurrents.

Production
In 2014 Live Nation was announced as a sponsor of the games; organizers stated that the company would leverage its resources to invite Canadian and international acts to perform at the ceremony. On July 15, 2015, organizers confirmed that American hip-hop artist Kanye West would headline the closing ceremony, joined by Pitbull and Serena Ryder. The announcement of West's participation was controversial, as critics and others believed that the closing ceremony should have been headlined by a Canadian artist; over 30,000 signatures were made on a Change.org petition to have him replaced. Mayor of Toronto John Tory, was also criticized for mistakenly referring to West as being a "proud product" of Toronto, despite actually being born in Atlanta.

Program 

The cultural portion of the ceremony took place on a stage with a scale model of Toronto's skyline, featuring a medley of dances representing various ethnic communities and music styles of Toronto. Following closing speeches by Ivar Sisniega, vice president of PASO, and Saad Rafi, president of the Toronto 2015 Organizing Committee, as per protocol, the Pan American Sports Organization flag was handed over by John Tory to Luis Castañeda Lossio, Mayor of Lima, Peru, host of the 2019 Pan American Games. This was followed by a cultural presentation by Peru, culminating with a sequence set to La Sarita's song "Carnaval".

Serena Ryder performed "Together We Are One", the official theme of the 2015 Pan American Games, along with her own hit "Stompa". Pitbull's segment featured songs such as "Fireball" and "Give Me Everything". Kanye West opened his set with "Stronger". After calling upon the lights to be turned on, he continued on with a set that included "Power, "Black Skinhead", "Gold Digger", "Touch the Sky", "All Of The Lights" and "Good Life". During his performance of "Good Life", West abruptly threw his microphone up in the air and walked off the stage; his performance had been afflicted by audio issues that caused his microphone to only be audible to television audiences. The ceremony concluded with a fireworks display on the CN Tower.

Flagbearers

Anthems
 Layla Claire, Ben Heppner and Children's Choirs – National Anthem of Canada
 Instrumental Version – Anthem of PASO
 Estefania Castilla – National Anthem of Peru

References

Closing ceremony
Pan American Games closing ceremonies
Ceremonies in Canada